Model E or E-model or variant, may refer to:

Aircraft
 Ace Model E Junior Ace, an interwar sport aircraft
 Burgess Model E, a pre-war aircraft
 Curtiss Model E, a 1911 aircraft
 Fike Model E, a 1970s light aircraft
 Wright Model E, a 1913 aircraft

Automotive and road transport
 AJS Model E, an interwar motorcycle produced after the AJS Model D
 BSA Model E, an interwar motorcycle
 Ford Model e, a research and development division of Ford Motor Company, focusing on electrified vehicles

Automobiles
 Cadillac Model E, a 1905 runabout automobile
 Doble Model E, an interwar steam automobile variation of the Doble steam car
 Tesla Model E, the intended name for the electric vehicle that was renamed the Tesla Model 3
 Honda e, an electric car by Honda

Other uses
 Comptometer Model E, a version of the Comptometer mechanical calculator 
 Vickers Model E machine gun, a WWI aircraft machine gun

See also

 Class E (disambiguation)
 E-Type (disambiguation)
 E (disambiguation)
 5 (disambiguation)
 ME (disambiguation)
 Model (disambiguation)